Ryan  (Irish: Ó Riain) is a common surname of Irish origin, as well as being a common given name in the English-speaking world.

Origins and meaning

There are several different origins for the surname. In some cases it may be a shortened form of O'Ryan, which is an Anglicized adaptation of the Gaelic surname Ó Riain, meaning "descendant of Rian". It can also be a shortened form of Mulryan or O'Mulryan, which are derived from the Gaelic Ó Maoilriain, meaning "descendant of the follower of Rian".

The meaning of the Old Irish name Rian is unknown. Some sources have suggested that it is related to the Old Irish word rían, meaning "water" or "ocean". Others have suggested that it is related to the Old Irish word rí, meaning "king". Both of these etymologies have been discounted by scholars, however. According to John Ryan, Professor of Early and Medieval History at University College Dublin, "What the Rian in the surnames Ó Riain and Ó Maolriain is has never been satisfactorily explained. Rian, like Niall, seems to be so ancient that its meaning was lost before records began."

Popular modern sources typically suggest that Ryan means "little king" or "illustrious".

There are also cases in which Ryan is an Americanized form of the German surname Rein.

List of persons with the surname Ryan

A–D 
Abram Joseph Ryan (1838–1886), Catholic priest, poet
Aileen B. Ryan (1912–1987), New York politician
Allan Ryan, American attorney
Allan A. Ryan, Jr. (1903–1981), New York financier and politician
Amy Ryan (born 1969), American actress
Andrew Ryan (disambiguation), several people
Anne Ryan (1889–1954), American artist
Anne Ryan (actress) (born 1969), American actress
B. J. Ryan (Robert Victor Ryan Jr., born 1975), baseball player
Barry Ryan (disambiguation), several people
Beatrice Judd Ryan (c. 1880–1966), Australian-American art dealer, curator
Ben Ryan, rugby union coach
Bernard Ryan (1900–1921), member of the IRA hanged in Dublin in 1921
Bernard Ryan, Jr. (1923–2020), American author
Bianca Ryan (born 1994), American singer and America's Got Talent winner
Bill Ryan (disambiguation), several people
Billy Ryan (1887–1951), American football player
Blanchard Ryan (born 1967), American actress
Bo Ryan (William Francis Ryan Jr, born 1947), American basketball coach
Bob Ryan (disambiguation), several people
Bobby Ryan (disambiguation), several people
Brendan Ryan (disambiguation), several people
Bruce Ryan (1921–2002), Australian rugby league footballer
Buddy Ryan (1931–2016), American football coach
C. J. Ryan (1943–2004), British priest and scholar of Italian studies
C. W. Ryan (1869–1944), American politician
Chris Ryan (disambiguation), several people
Christopher Ryan (born 1950), British actor
Claude Ryan (1925–2004), Canadian politician
Cornelius Ryan (1920–1974), Irish journalist and author
Debby Ryan (born 1993), American actress
Derek Ryan (disambiguation), several people
Donald P. Ryan (born 1957), American archaeologist and writer
Donnell Ryan, Federal Court of Australia judge

E–L 
Edward Ryan (disambiguation), several people
Eileen Ryan (1927–2022), American actress
Felix Ryan (1897–1963), Australian rugby league footballer
Francis T. Ryan (1862–1927), American Medal of Honor recipient
Frank Ryan (disambiguation), several people
Fred Ryan (born 1955), CEO of Politico.com, former aide to Ronald Reagan
Frederick Ryan (1876–1913), Irish playwright and socialist
George Ryan (born 1934), Governor of Illinois
George Ryan (Canadian politician) (1806–1876), New Brunswick politician
Gerry Ryan (1956–2010), Irish radio presenter
Greg Ryan (born 1957), German-American soccer defender
Gig Ryan (born 1956), Australian poet
Harold M. Ryan (1911–2007), U.S. Representative from Michigan
Ibolya Ryan, Hungarian-American murder victim 
Ida Annah Ryan (1873–1950), American architect
Ida Mary Barry Ryan (1854-1917), American philanthropist
Irene Ryan (1902–1973), actress
Jack Ryan (disambiguation), several people
Jane Ryan (disambiguation), several people
Jeff Ryan (disambiguation), several people
Jeri Ryan (born 1968), U.S. actress
Jim Ryan (disambiguation), several people
Jimmy Ryan (disambiguation), several people
Joan Ryan (politician) (born 1955), UK politician
Joe Ryan (baseball) (born 1996), American baseball player
John Ryan (disambiguation), several people
Jon Ryan (born 1981), Canadian gridiron football player
Joseph Ryan (disambiguation), several people
Josephine Ryan (1884–1977), Irish nationalist
Katherine Ryan (born 1983), Canadian/Irish comedian, writer, presenter and actress
Kathleen Ryan (1922–1985), Irish actress
Kathryn Ryan, New Zealand radio journalist
Kelleigh Ryan (born 1987), Canadian fencer
Kevin Ryan (born 1949), New Zealand long-distance runner
Kyle Ryan (born 1991), American baseball player
Lacy Ryan, English actor
Lance Ryan (born 1971), Canadian operatic tenor
Leo Ryan (1925–1978), Congressman from San Francisco, killed at Jonestown
Lee Ryan (born 1983), English singer-songwriter and actor
Liam Ryan (disambiguation), several people
Liza Ryan (born 1965), American visual artist
Lola Ryan (1925–2003), Australian artist
Lucille Frances Ryan, better known as Lucy Lawless (born 1968), actress from New Zealand

M–R 
Michael Robert Ryan, a murderer from the UK
Marion Ryan (1931–1999), British singer
Mark Ryan (disambiguation), several people
Matthew Ryan (disambiguation), several people
Meg Ryan (born 1961), U.S. actress
Michael Ryan (disambiguation), several people
Michelle Ryan (born 1984), British actress of Irish ancestry
Miles Ryan (1826–1887), Irish recipient of the Victoria Cross
Mitchell Ryan (1934-2022), American actor
Murray Ryan (1922–2017), American politician
Myles and Connor Ryan (born 1995), British singers
Nolan Ryan (born 1947), baseball player
Patricia Ryan (disambiguation), several people
Patrick Ryan (disambiguation), several people
Paul Ryan (disambiguation), several people
Peggy Ryan (1924–2004), American dancer
Perry T. Ryan (born 1962), American author
Peter Ryan (disambiguation), several people
Phil Ryan (disambiguation), several people
Phyllis Ryan (1895–1983), Irish chemist and nationalist
Phyllis Ryan (actress) (1920–2011), Irish actress
Prestin Ryan (born 1980), Canadian ice hockey player
Rex Ryan (born 1962), American football coach; twin brother of Rob
Richard Ryan (disambiguation), several people
Richie Ryan (disambiguation), several people
Rob Ryan (born 1962), American football coach; twin brother of Rex
Robert Ryan (disambiguation), several people
Ronald Ryan (1925–1967), (Last person to be legally executed in Australia.)
Ross Ryan (born 1950), Australian singer-songwriter
Roz Ryan (born 1951), American actress

S–Z 
Séamus Ryan (1895–1933), Irish senator
Sheila Ryan, (1921–1975), American actress
Sod Ryan (1905–1964), American football player
Taylor Ryan (Born 1993), Australian journalist
Tomás Ryan (born 1944), Irish hurler
Thomas Ryan (disambiguation), several people
T. Claude Ryan (1898–1982), American aviator and aeronautic engineer
T. J. Ryan (Thomas Joseph Ryan, 1876–1921), Australian politician, premier of Queensland
T. J. Ryan (hurler) (born 1974), Irish hurler
Thomas Ryan (disambiguation), several people
Tim Ryan (disambiguation), several people
Tina Rivers Ryan, American curator, art historian 
Tommy Ryan (disambiguation), several people
Tony Ryan (1936–2007), Irish businessman
Tony Ryan (scientist) (born 1962), British polymer chemist
Una Ryan (born 1941), Malaysian born biologist
Walter D'Arcy Ryan (1870–1934), lighting engineer
Warren Ryan (born 1941), Australian rugby league football coach
Willard Ryan (1890–1962), American football coach
Will Ryan (1949–2021), American voice actor, singer, and comedian
William Ryan (disambiguation), several people
Yasmine Ryan (c. 1983 – 2017) New Zealand journalist

Fictional characters 
April Ryan, appearing in the computer adventure games The Longest Journey and Dreamfall
Andrew Ryan, the founder of Rapture and a major character in the 2007 video game BioShock
Archie Ryan, the pseudonym of Lincoln Burrows, a fictional character from the television show Prison Break
Barbara Ryan, character in the soap opera As the World Turns
Beth Ryan, a character in the 1987 movie Throw Momma from the Train
Burke Ryan, a character in the 2009 American romantic drama movie Love Happens
Caitlin Ryan, a character in the Degrassi franchise*
Jack Ryan, a separate character and the primary protagonist of the 2007 video game BioShock
Jake Ryan, character in Sixteen Candles/Hannah Montana, TV character portrayed by Cody Linley
James Francis Ryan, character in the 1998 American war film Saving Private Ryan
Kevin Ryan, secondary character of the TV thriller show Castle
Mary Ryan, also known aka Blue Mary, a character in the Fatal Fury series and The King of Fighters
Mr. Ryan, a character in the 1989 American science fiction comedy  movie Bill & Ted's Excellent Adventure
Nory Ryan, main character in book Nory Ryan's Song by Patricia Reilly Giff
Richie Ryan, fictional character in Highlander: The Series
Robert Charles "Rusty" Ryan in Ocean's 11, 12, and 13
Professor Sam Ryan, character in the television series Silent Witness
Tommy Ryan, a character in the 1997 film Titanic

See also
Rayan (Persian given name)
Rhyan, given name and surname

References

Bibliography

External links
 "Uí Dróna Kingdom" by Niall C. E. J. O'Brien, April 27, 2015, Medieval News

Anglicised Irish-language surnames
English-language surnames
Surnames of Irish origin

es:Ryan
fr:Ryan
ja:ライアン